Tyler Glaiel (born 1990), also known by the moniker Glaiel Games, is an American video game designer and programmer known for games such as Aether (2008), Closure (2012), Number (2013), Bombernauts (2017) and The End is Nigh (2017).

Life and career
Glaiel is a native of Westfield, Massachusetts. He developed his first game, a simple thing called Pigeon Pooper using Adobe Flash in 2002, before his twelfth birthday. By high school, Glaiel was already one of the most successful game on Newgrounds, reportedly earning thousands of dollars from his games alone, leading Jonathan Holmes of Destructoid to calling him "the Doogie Howser of videogames". He became a frequent collaborator of Edmund McMillen and went on to develop several titles together. His game, Closure, won the Gameplay Innovation award at Indiecade 2009 and the Independent Games Festival award for Excellence in Audio in 2010, in addition to being nominated in the Innovation and Technical Excellence categories. The following year, he was invited to participate in the IGF's jury for the festival's innovation award, Nuovo.

Glaiel was included in the Forbes 30 Under 30 games industry section in 2016. Utilizing and building up a proprietary game engine of his own creation that allowed for SVG assets created in Adobe Flash to be imported expediently, Glaiel collaborated with McMillen for several months on The End is Nigh, before it was released in 2017. In 2018, McMillen announced that he had acquired the rights to his previous project, Mewgenics and that he and Glaiel have begun developing it.

As of 2020, he was living in California. In 2020, at the onset of the COVID-19 pandemic when face masks were becoming mandated by law in many parts of the world, Glaiel received a great deal of attention for a voice-activated LED face mask he made on a lark. The positive press led Glaiel to take the mask to Kickstarter, where he was able to raise over US$70,000 to mass-produce it under the name JabberMask.

Selected Ludography

References

External links
 TYLER GLAIEL'S STUFF

Indie video game developers
Browser game developers
American inventors
1990 births
Living people